San Román is one of 24 parishes (administrative divisions) in Piloña, a municipality within the province and autonomous community of Asturias, in northern Spain.

The population is 243 (INE 2011).

Villages and hamlets
 Argandenes 
 San Miguel 
 San Román 
 Valles 
 La Aguilera 
 Pandoto (Pandotu) 
 Pascual 
 San Pedro
 Soto de San Roman 
 Torion 
 Villartemi 
 Campo Redondo

References

Parishes in Piloña